The Marriott World Trade Center was a 22-story, 825-room hotel  at 3 World Trade Center within the World Trade Center complex in Manhattan, New York City. It opened in April 1981 as the Vista International Hotel and was the first major hotel to open in Lower Manhattan south of Canal Street since 1836. It was also known as World Trade Center 3 (WTC 3 or 3 WTC), the World Trade Center Hotel, the Vista Hotel, and the Marriott Hotel throughout its history.

The hotel was damaged in the 1993 World Trade Center bombing. It was destroyed beyond repair as a result of the September 11 attacks, due to structural damage caused by the collapse of the Twin Towers, specifically the South Tower. The hotel was not replaced as part of the new World Trade Center complex, although its address was reused for a tower at 175 Greenwich Street.

Description
The building was a 22-story steel-framed structure with 825 rooms and six basement levels (labeled B1 through B6).

The hotel was connected to the North and South towers via underground entrances at concourse level, and a small pedestrian walkway that extended from the west promenade of the Marriott to the North Tower on plaza level. On the 22nd floor, there was a gym that was the largest of any hotel in New York City at the time, with a swimming pool and a running track facing the Hudson River. The hotel also had  of meeting space on the entire third floor, along with the New Amsterdam Ballroom on the main floor. It was considered a four-diamond hotel by the American Automobile Association (AAA).

Inside the complex, there were a few establishments including The American Harvest Restaurant, The Greenhouse Café, Tall Ships Bar & Grill, the 'Times Square Gifts' store, The Russia House Restaurant, The Grayline New York Tour Bus ticket counter, and a hair salon named Olga's.

History 

The hotel was first known as the Vista International Hotel, but also became known as World Trade Center 3 (WTC 3 or 3 WTC), the World Trade Center Hotel, the Vista Hotel and the Marriott Hotel. The building was designed by Skidmore, Owings & Merrill with construction beginning in March 1979. The hotel opened on April 1, 1981, with 100 of 825 rooms available, and it was completed in July 1981. Shortly before the opening day of the Marriott, a fire broke out on the 7th floor. The Vista International was the first major hotel to open in Lower Manhattan south of Canal Street since 1836.

The building was originally owned by the Port Authority of New York and New Jersey, which sold it to KUO Hotels of Korea. In 1989, the Port Authority bought it back for $78 million but the operating rights remained in the hands of Hilton International as management agent. On November 9, 1995, it was sold to Host Marriott Corporation for $141.5 million. This was one year after the reopening due to an extensive renovation following the 1993 World Trade Center bombing. The new company started operations in January 1996.

In 2002, Host Marriott Corporation was offered an opportunity to rebuild the hotel in the same location within the World Trade Center site as its lease which was signed until 2094 had not expired. Marriott declined the offer, and in October 2003, the Port Authority of New York and New Jersey voted on an agreement under which the Host Marriott Corporation would "surrender the premises" resulting in termination of the lease and thus giving the land to the National September 11 Memorial & Museum.

1993 World Trade Center bombing
On February 26, 1993, the hotel was seriously damaged as a result of the World Trade Center bombing. Terrorists affiliated with al-Qaeda took a Ryder truck loaded with 1,500 pounds (682 kilograms) of explosives and parked it in the North Tower parking garage below the hotel's ballroom. At 12:18 p.m. (EDT), the explosion destroyed or seriously damaged the lower and sub levels of the World Trade Center complex. After extensive repairs, the hotel reopened on November 1, 1994, and one year later in 1995, it was purchased by Marriott.

September 11, 2001 attacks

On September 11, 2001, the hotel had 940 registered guests. In addition, the National Association for Business Economics (NABE) was holding its yearly conference at the hotel from September 8 to 11, 2001.

When American Airlines Flight 11 crashed into the North Tower (1 WTC) at 8:46 a.m. EDT, its landing gear fell on the hotel's roof. Firefighters used the lobby as a staging area, and were also in the hotel to evacuate guests that may have still been inside. Firefighters also reported human remains of entire corpses on the roof from people that were forced to jump or accidentally fell from the burning towers. The collapse of the South Tower (2 WTC) at 9:59 a.m. EDT essentially split the building in half. The collapse of the North Tower at 10:28 a.m. EDT destroyed the rest of the hotel aside from a small section that was farthest from the North Tower. Fourteen people who had been trying to evacuate the partially destroyed hotel after the first collapse managed to survive the second collapse in this small section. The section of the hotel that managed to survive the collapse of the Twin Towers had been upgraded after the 1993 bombing.

On the afternoon of September 11, photographer Thomas E. Franklin captured the now-iconic image Raising the Flag at Ground Zero, depicting the U.S. flag being raised by firefighters upon a flagpole believed to have been Marriott property located on what remained of the hotel grounds.

Aftermath 
As a result of the collapse of the Twin Towers, the hotel was destroyed beyond repair. Only a small three-story section of the southernmost part of the building remained standing, all of which was eventually removed. In the remnants of the lobby, picture frames with the pictures inside them were still hanging on the walls. Approximately 40 people died in the hotel, including two hotel employees who had stayed to aid the evacuation and a number of firefighters who had been clearing the hotel and using it as a staging ground.

In January 2002, the remnants of the hotel were completely dismantled. The National September 11 Memorial & Museum was built where the hotel once stood.

The building and its survivors were featured in the television special documentary film Hotel Ground Zero, which premiered September 11, 2009 on the History Channel.

References

External links
 Marriott World Trade Center Survivors
 Stories by NABE members about the attack
 The 9/11 Hotel, a five-part documentary video on YouTube including interviews with surviving guests and workers at the Marriott World Trade Center
 Marriott World Trade Center Website - Archived on Internet Archive

Buildings and structures completed in 1981
Buildings and structures destroyed in the September 11 attacks
Defunct hotels in Manhattan
Demolished hotels in New York City
Marriott International
World Trade Center
September 11 attacks
1981 establishments in New York City
Hotels established in 1981
Hotels disestablished in 2001